Mumbai Central (formerly Bombay Central, station code: MMCT)  is a major railway station on the Western line, situated in Mumbai, Maharashtra in an area known by the same name. It serves as a major stop for both Local and Inter-City/Express trains with separate platforms for them. It is also a terminal for several long-distance trains including the Mumbai Rajdhani Express. It is one of the five major Terminal stations in Mumbai while others being Mumbai CST, Mumbai LTT, Mumbai BDTS and Mumbai Dadar. Trains depart from the station connecting various destinations mostly across states in the northern, western and north-western parts of India. The station was renamed from Bombay Central to Mumbai Central in 1997, following the change of Bombay to Mumbai. In 2018, a resolution was passed to change the station code to MMCT, with implementation ongoing.

History
It was designed by the British architect Claude Batley, and constructed by the Shapoorji Pallonji in 1930 in a record time of 21 months. The project was then costed INR 15.6 million.

When the station opened in 1930, The Times of India suggested that the name Bombay Central was inspired by the Grand Central Terminal in New York City. The paper argued that the station should have been called Kamathipura, after the area it was located in. The paper suggested that the name Kamathipura was probably ruled out, because the area is a red-light district.

The Bombay, Baroda and Central India Railway extended its reach from Baroda to Pathankot via Delhi. The Colaba-Ballard Pier railway station proved insufficient in meeting the demands of a growing population which led the government to make plans for the construction of Bombay Central.

The present suburban route that once ran till Colaba was earlier served by Bellasis Road station. It was renamed Bombay Central (local) after the construction of the long-distance Bombay Central Terminus (BCT) on the eastern side. On 1 Feb 2018, a resolution was passed to change the station code from BCT to MMCT.

Infrastructure

Platforms and layout
The station is divided into two parts. The eastern half of the station serves long-distance trains operated by Western Railways while the western half serves commuter trains running on the Churchgate–Virar suburban section of Western Railways. The mainline section has five high level platforms terminating in a large concourse on the southern end. The suburban section has four high level platforms. All the platforms are connected by foot overbridges and the mainline platforms are wheelchair accessible from the south end.

Tickets and reservation
A large Passenger Reservation Center with several ticket windows is located on the east side of the mainline station. Tickets between any two stations in India on any train offering reserved accommodation can be purchased from this facility. There are many Unreserved Ticket Counters in the main concourse for purchasing unreserved tickets for immediate travel on express and passenger trains starting from Mumbai Central. The west and south exits of the suburban section of the station have ticket windows for purchasing tickets for travel on the suburban trains. Suburban train tickets can also be purchased from automatic ticket vending machines (ATVMs) located at several locations in the station premises.

Food and other facilities
The concourse on the mainline side has an outlet of Rajdhani chain of restaurants  serving authentic Indian food.

Bellasis Rail Café at Mumbai Central is located on the first floor near Bellasis Road overbridge connecting Mumbai Central station near the south end booking office. Items in this café are available in food packets, with ready to take away facility.

There are several stalls in the concourse and on the suburban platforms serving snacks, chips, bottled water and cold drinks (soda). There are book stalls in the main concourse and on the suburban platforms selling newspapers, magazines and other reading material. Train timetables are also available at the book stalls. Restrooms (toilets) are available in the concourse on the mainline side.

Gardens
There are two gardens located outside the station. One of the gardens houses a historic locomotive, popularly known as the "Little red horse". The locomotive was built by English firm Kerr Stuart and Co. in 1928. The engine operated on the Devgarh-Baria Railway Narrow Gauge line, owned by the Princely state of Devgarh-Baria. The line was merged into Bombay, Baroda and Central India Railway (BB&CI) in August 1949, and later became part of the Western Railway. The engine served for 61 years, before being transferred to the Pratapnagar workshop for shunting duties in 1990. It was placed at the garden in front of the Mumbai Central station in 1991 to commemorate its platinum jubilee.

WiFi Services

RailTel, the telecom arm of the Indian Railways, on 22 January 2016 launched free public Wi-Fi service at Mumbai Central station in collaboration with Google.

"We are delighted to launch India's first high-speed public Wi-Fi service in partnership with Indian Railways", Google South East Asia and India VP & Managing Director Rajan Anandan said.

References

Railway centrals in India
Mumbai WR railway division
Railway stations in Mumbai City district
Mumbai Suburban Railway stations
Railway stations opened in 1930
1930 establishments in British India